Artemida (Greek: Αρτέμιδα) is a former municipality in Magnesia, Thessaly, Greece. Since the 2011 local government reform it is part of the municipality Volos, of which it is a municipal unit. The municipal unit has an area of 28.791 km2. Population 4,145 (2011). The seat of the municipality was in Ano Lechonia.

References

Populated places in Pelion
Populated places in Magnesia (regional unit)